SaferNet is a Brazilian non-governmental organization that combats Internet crime in partnership with the Federal Public Ministry. It facilitates anonymous reporting and provides information and training about Internet safety and security.

Safernet facilitates anonymous reporting of crimes, with extra consideration for preventing and investigating child pornography, identity theft and various hate crimes. It also works with the government to improve legislation for Internet-related crimes. Safernet also educates, trains, and mobilizes the public on issues relating to their rights and safety.

In 2006, Safernet and the Federal Public Ministry brought a suit against Google's Brazilian business unit alleging that Google was not policing Orkut pages enough to prevent pornography and hate crimes. Complying with the judge's ruling, Google provided the requested user information to the Brazilian authorities.

References

External links
 Safernet Official Homepage

Non-profit organisations based in Brazil
Cybercrime
Internet in Brazil
Computer security organizations